Herbert Buster (December 26, 1914 – November 8, 1976) was an American Negro league second baseman in the 1940s.

A native of New Orleans, Louisiana, Buster played for the Chicago American Giants in 1943 and served in the US Army during World War II. He died in Little Rock, Arkansas in 1976 at age 61.

References

External links
 and Seamheads 
 Herbert Buster at Arkansas Baseball Encyclopedia

1914 births
1976 deaths
Chicago American Giants players
20th-century African-American sportspeople